Surgan is a village in Sistan and Baluchestan Province, Iran.

Surgan, also rendered as Surgavan, may also refer to:
 Surgan-e Olya, Kerman Province
 Surgan-e Sofla, Kerman Province